Lorenz Jäger (born 6 June 1951 in Bad Homburg vor der Höhe) is a German sociologist and journalist.

Biography 
Lorenz Jäger studied sociology and German literature at the Philipps-Universität Marburg and the Johann Wolfgang Goethe-Universität Frankfurt am Main. In Marburg Jäger was influenced by the four following scholars: sociologist Heinz Maus, Germanist Heinz Schlaffer, art historian Martin Warnke and the literature scientist Gert Mattenklott. Jäger did his sociology diploma at the Horkheimer-student Maus. After his doctorate in German literature he taught at the Kent State University in Ohio. From 1985 until 1988 he taught at the Hokkaido University in Sapporo (Japan). Since 1 January 1997 he is editor in the liberal arts department of the German broadsheet Frankfurter Allgemeine Zeitung. Since 2009 he writes a column about religious topics in the Frankfurter Allgemeine Sonntagszeitung, which was published as a book in 2010. Lorenz Jäger is married with two children.

Monographs 
 Messianische Kritik. Studien zu Leben und Werk von Florens Christian Rang, Böhlau-Verlag, Frankfurt am Main 1983, .
 Adorno. Eine politische Biographie, DVA, München 2003, .
 Das Hakenkreuz. Zeichen im Weltbürgerkrieg. Eine Kulturgeschichte, Karolinger Verlag, Wien 2006, .
 Die schöne Kunst, das Schicksal zu lesen. Kleines Brevier der Astrologie, zu Klampen Verlag, Springe 2009, .
 Hinter dem großen Orient, Karolinger Verlag, Wien 2009, .
 Hauptsachen. Gedanken und Einsichten über den Glauben und die Kirche, Mit einem Vorwort von Martin Mosebach; Fe-Medienverlag, Kißlegg 2010 .
 Signaturen des Schicksals, Verlag Matthes & Seitz Berlin, Berlin 2012, .
 Prägungen. Karolinger Verlag, Wien/Leipzig 2013,

Literature 
 Philipp von Wussow: „Eine Karikatur der Theorie“. Zur neueren Adorno-Biographik. In: Naharaim. Zeitschrift für deutsch-jüdische Literatur und Kulturgeschichte 1/2007, pp. 131–147.

References

External links 
 
 Short biography on the website of the FAZ
 Article "Adieu, Kameraden, ich bin Gutmensch" in the FAZ, October 5, 2011, published online October 13, 2011, visited September 21, 2013

1951 births
German journalists
German male journalists
German newspaper journalists
20th-century German journalists
21st-century German journalists
German non-fiction writers
Living people
German male writers
Frankfurter Allgemeine Zeitung people